Psalm 112 is the 112th psalm of the biblical Book of Psalms, a psalm "in praise of the virtuous". This psalm, along with Psalm 111, is acrostic by phrase, that is, each 7-9 syllable phrase begins with a letter of the Hebrew alphabet in order. Psalm 119 is also acrostic, with each eight-verse strophe commencing with a letter of the Hebrew alphabet.

In the slightly different numbering system used in the Greek Septuagint version of the bible and in the Latin Vulgate, this psalm is Psalm 111.

Text

Hebrew Bible version
Following is the Hebrew text of Psalm 112:

King James Version
 Praise ye the LORD. Blessed is the man that feareth the LORD, that delighteth greatly in his commandments.
 His seed shall be mighty upon earth: the generation of the upright shall be blessed.
 Wealth and riches shall be in his house: and his righteousness endureth for ever.
 Unto the upright there ariseth light in the darkness: he is gracious, and full of compassion, and righteous.
 A good man sheweth favour, and lendeth: he will guide his affairs with discretion.
 Surely he shall not be moved for ever: the righteous shall be in everlasting remembrance.
 He shall not be afraid of evil tidings: his heart is fixed, trusting in the LORD.
 His heart is established, he shall not be afraid, until he see his desire upon his enemies.
 He hath dispersed, he hath given to the poor; his righteousness endureth for ever; his horn shall be exalted with honour.
 The wicked shall see it, and be grieved; he shall gnash with his teeth, and melt away: the desire of the wicked shall perish.

Latin Vulgate
 Beatus vir, qui timet Dominum, in mandatis ejus volet nimis.
 Potens in terra erit semen ejus, generatio rectorum benedicetur.
 Gloria et divitiae in domo ejus, et iustitia ejus manet in saeculum saeculi.
 Exortum est in tenebris lumen rectis, misericors et miserator et iustus.
 Iucundus homo, qui miseretur et commodat, disponet res suas in judicio,
 quia in aeternum non commovebitur. In memoria aeterna erit iustus,
 ab auditione mala non timebit. Paratum cor ejus, sperare in Domino,
 confirmatum est cor eius, non commovebitur, donec despiciat inimicos suos.
 Dispersit dedit pauperibus; justitia ejus manet in saeculum saeculi, cornu ejus exaltabitur in gloria.
 Peccator videbit et irascetur, dentibus suis fremet et tabescet. Desiderium peccatorum peribit.

Uses

Judaism
The psalm begins הַלְלוּ-יָהּ:אַשְׁרֵי-אִישׁ, יָרֵא אֶת-יְהוָה; בְּמִצְו‍ֹתָיו, חָפֵץ מְאֹד.

New Testament
Verse 9 is quoted in 2 Corinthians 9:9.

Catholic Church
Saint Benedict of Nursia attributed the psalms from the Psalm 110 at the services of Vespers, in its Rule of St. Benedict set to 530 AD. So this psalm was traditionally recited or sung during the solemn service of Vespers on Sunday between the Psalm 111 and Psalm 113.

In ordinary Roman rite, Psalm 112 is currently the reading of the fifth Sunday in Ordinary Time. Moreover, in the Liturgy of the Hours enacted in 1970, the psalm is still recited at Vespers of Sunday's fourth week and evening of the Solemnity of the Epiphany.

Musical settings
The Latin text was set to music by many composers of different nationalities, such as Antonio Vivaldi or Claudio Monteverdi. In France, Michel-Richard Delalande (S39), and André Campra. Marc-Antoine Charpentier composed 5 different "Beatus vir qui timet Dominum", H.154, H.199-H.199 a, H.208, H.221, H.224 (1670 - 1695) and many others composers also used these words.

It is usually known by its opening phrase Beatus vir (also the beginning of Psalm 1), under which title it is included in numerous musical settings such as Claudio Monteverdi's 1640 Selva morale e spirituale, also known as the Vespers of 1640; Vivaldi's 'Beatus Vir', the third movements of Mozart's Vesperae de Dominica (K. 321) and Vesperae solennes de confessore (K. 339). Beatus Vir (Gorecki) (Opus 38, subtitled Psalm for baritone, large mixed chorus and grand orchestra), is a musical psalm setting written by Henryk  Górecki in 1979.

References

External links

 in Hebrew and English - Mechon-mamre
 King James Bible - Wikisource

112